War Cloud (1915–1923) was a British-bred Thoroughbred racehorse who was the first horse to compete in all three U.S.Triple Crown races.

Background
Bred by Jack Barnato Joel, one of Britain's most prominent Thoroughbred owner/breeders, War Cloud was sold as a yearling and brought to race in the United States.

Racing career

Successful racing at age two, War Cloud was the heavy favorite going into the 1918 Kentucky Derby after the U.S. Two-yr-Old Champion Colt Sun Briar was sidelined with ringbone disease. Ridden by Johnny Loftus, War Cloud finished fourth to longshot Exterminator.

The $17,500 Preakness Stakes attracted a very large field and was in two divisions. In the first division, War Cloud went off as the second favorite at post time at roughly 8/5, carrying 110 pounds (three more than any other runner), behind Lanius, who was the betting favorite at 7/5 and carried 107 pounds. Starting from post position five, War Cloud settled in third, stalking the leaders, George Starr and Flags, as they passed the stands for the first time. War Cloud then moved to the outside and passed the leaders going around the clubhouse turn, going in :48 flat for the first half mile. He widened his lead to two lengths down the backstretch, completing 3/4 mile in 1:13 flat. In the stretch, 53/1 longshot Sunny Slope challenged. War Cloud, ridden hard by jockey Johnny Loftus, held on to win by 3/4 of a length. After War Cloud and Sunny Slope, it was another ten lengths back to favorite Lanius in third, with Johren fourth. The second division was won by Jack Hare, Jr.

In the final leg of the Triple Crown races, the Belmont Stakes, War Cloud finished second to Harry Payne Whitney's colt, Johren. In the Dwyer Stakes at Aqueduct Race Track in July however, War Cloud showed "brilliant speed" to defeat Jack Hare, Jr. and Johren in front of a huge crowd. After racing successfully at age four, War Cloud was shipped to France to race in his five-year-old season but did not perform well.

Retirement
He was brought back to stand at stud at Claiborne Farm in Paris, Kentucky, but broke a leg in 1923 and was euthanized. He is buried in Claiborne's equine cemetery.

Pedigree

War Cloud was inbred 3 × 4 to Hampton, meaning that this stallion appears in both the third and fourth generation of his pedigree.

References 

1915 racehorse births
1923 racehorse deaths
Racehorses bred in the United Kingdom
Racehorses trained in the United States
Preakness Stakes winners
Thoroughbred family 4-l